The Expulsion of the Garden of Eden or the Expulsion from Paradise refers to the Biblical account of the ejection of Adam and Eve from the Garden of Eden as part of the Fall of man.

Expulsion of the Garden of Eden is also the name or subject of various works of art:

 Expulsion from the Garden of Eden, by Masaccio (c. 1425)
 Expulsion from Paradise, by Pontormo (c. 1535)
 Expulsion from the Garden of Eden, by Thomas Cole (1828)
 Expulsion: Moon and Firelight, another painting by Cole (c. 1828)
 The Expulsion from Paradise (1977 film)

See also 
 The Creation and The Expulsion from Paradise, by Giovanni di Paolo (1445)
 The Fall and Expulsion from Paradise in the ceiling of the Sistine Chapel, by Michelangelo (1512)
 Paradise Lost by John Milton (1667)
 The Expulsion of Adam and Eve from the Garden of Eden, an illustration of Paradise Lost by William Blake (1807 and 1808)